Charles Émile Stuyvaert (21 May 1851 – 18 November 1908) was a Belgian astronomer. He was a contemporary of Albert Lancaster, Louis Niesten and Jean-Charles Houzeau.

Life 

He was born on 21 May 1851 in Schaerbeek, Brussels.

Career 

He is most famous for his trip to San Antonio, Texas in 1882 along with Jean-Charles Houzeau. Together they were able to observe the transit of Venus across the Sun for the first time in human history.

References

External links 
 https://web.archive.org/web/20131202234115/http://www.digilife.be/aeg/guidestar/Guidestar10-2012.pdf
 http://articles.adsabs.harvard.edu/cgi-bin/nph-iarticle_query?bibcode=1908C%26T....29..513R&db_key=AST&page_ind=2&plate_select=NO&data_type=GIF&type=SCREEN_GIF&classic=YES&high=4f7961bcd519618
 http://www.eclipsetours.com/paul-maley/belgian-venus-transit/
 https://archive.org/stream/bulletindelasoc01brusgoog/bulletindelasoc01brusgoog_djvu.txt

1851 births
1908 deaths
19th-century Belgian astronomers